The Miss Oregon Teen USA competition is the pageant that selects the representative for the state of Oregon in the Miss Teen USA pageant.

Until Tennessee's victory in 2009, Oregon was the only state to win more than one Miss Teen USA title. Alongside Texas they are the only two states to have produced three winners. The first two came within the years of each other, when Mindy Duncan won in 1988 becoming the 6th state that won the Miss Teen USA title for the first time and Bridgette Wilson won in 1990 who became the 8th Miss Teen USA titleholder. Wilson went on to become a successful actress and was awarded a special "Distinguished Achievement Award" in 1998. The third came over a decade later, when Tami Farrell won the crown in 2003 who became the 21st Miss Teen USA titleholder.

Oregon has received four other placements in Miss Teen USA history: 3rd runner up in 1984, semi-finalist in 1993 and 1st runner up in both 2017 and 2020, respectively. Oregon also won two Miss Congeniality awards, in 2001 and 2003.

Only two Miss Oregon Teen USAs have won the Miss Oregon USA title and competed at Miss USA. Tami Farrell placed first runner-up at and later assumed the Miss California USA 2009 title after the dethronement of Carrie Prejean but did not compete at Miss USA.

Heather and Jenna Jones, Miss Oregon Teen USA titleholders for 1996 and 2005 respectively, are sisters.

The current titleholder is Alaina McClanen-Clemons of Portland, Oregon and was crowned on January 15, 2022. She will represent Oregon for the title of Miss Teen USA 2022.

Results summary

Placements
Miss Teen USAs: Mindy Duncan (1988), Bridgette Wilson (1990), Tami Farrell (2003)
1st runner-up: Vanessa Matheson (2017), Shayla Montgomery (2020)
3rd runner-up: Dena Woodard (1984)
Top 12: Jill Chartier (1993)
Oregon holds a record of 7 placements at  Miss Teen USA.

Awards
Miss Congeniality: Sarah Warner (2001), Tami Farrell (2003)

Winners 

1 Age at the time of the Miss Teen USA pageant

References

External links
Official website

Oregon
Oregon beauty pageants
Women in Oregon
1983 establishments in Oregon